John Phillips or Philips may refer to:

Academics
 John Edward Philips (born 1952), American historian
John Phillips (educator) (1719–1795), American educator and founder of Phillips Exeter Academy
John Phillips (priest) (1879–1947), Welsh schoolmaster, Dean of Monmouth
John Phillips (lawyer), English law professor and head of King's College School of Law

Arts and entertainment
John Phillip (poet) (fl. 1561), English poet and dramatist
John Phillips (fl. 1570–1591), English writer and poet
John Phillips (author) (1631–1706), English author and secretary to John Milton
John Philips (1676–1709), British poet
John Phillips (artist) (1808–after 1842), English illustrator and portraitist
John Sanborn Phillips (1861–1949), American writer and founder of McClure's Magazine
John Phillips (actor) (1914–1995), British actor
John Phillips (photographer) (1914–1996), Algerian-American photographer for Life magazine
John P. Marquand (a.k.a. John Phillips, 1924–1995), American novelist
John Phillips (musician) (1935–2001), American singer, songwriter and guitarist, member of The Mamas and the Papas

Business and industry
John Phillips (c. 1709–1775), English master carpenter
John Leigh Philips (1761–1814), English textile manufacturer and collector of art
John George Phillips (businessman) (1888–1964), American businessman, president of IBM
Sir J. G. Phillips (1911–1986), Australian economist, Governor of the Reserve Bank of Australia

Politics and law

U.S.
John Phillips (mayor) (1770–1823), American politician, first mayor of Boston
John Phillips (Pennsylvania politician) (fl. 1821–1823), American congressman from Pennsylvania
John Phillips (Wisconsin politician) (1823–1903), American physician and politician
John Finis Philips (1834–1919), U.S. Representative from Missouri
John Calhoun Phillips (1870–1943), American politician, Governor of Arizona
John R. Phillips (American politician) (1887–1983), American congressman from California
John R. Phillips (attorney) (born 1942), American diplomat and public interest attorney
John Michael Phillips (born 1975), American lawyer, consumer and civil rights advocate and legal commentator
John Alton Phillips, member of the Mississippi House of Representatives

Elsewhere
Sir John Philipps, 1st Baronet (died 1629), Welsh landowner and politician
John Phillips (Canadian politician) (1810–?), Canadian politician in New Brunswick
John Phillips (Irish politician) (1839/40–1917), Irish Member of Parliament for South Longford
John Harber Phillips (1933–2009), Australian barrister and Chief Justice of the Supreme Court of Victoria
John David Phillips (born 1936), Australian lawyer and judge

Religion
John Phillips (bishop of Sodor and Man) (1555–1633), Welsh Anglican bishop
John Phillips (Puritan), English minister in England and Massachusetts
John Bertram Phillips (1906–1982), British Bible translator, writer and clergyman
John Phillips (bishop of Portsmouth) (1910–1985), British anglican bishop

Science and medicine
John Phillips (geologist) (1800–1874), English geologist
John Arthur Phillips (1822–1887), British geologist, metallurgist and mining engineer
John Phillips (physician) (1855–1928), British physician
John Charles Phillips (1876–1938), American hunter, zoologist, ornithologist and environmentalist 
J. F. V. Phillips (1899–1987), South African botanist and ecologist
John Phillips (zoologist) (1933–1987), British zoologist, vice-chancellor of Loughborough University
John L. Phillips (born 1951), American astronaut

Sports

Cricket
John Phillips (Guyanese cricketer) (1902-1967), Guyanese cricketer
John Phillips (South African cricketer) (1910–1985), South African cricketer
John Phillips (English cricketer) (1933–2017), English cricketer
John Phillips (New Zealand cricketer) (1949-2017), New Zealand cricketer

Other sports
John Phillips (snooker player) (1935-2008), Scottish snooker player
John Phillips (basketball coach) (born 1947), American college basketball coach
John Phillips (footballer) (1951–2017), English-born Welsh international goalkeeper
John Phillips (sport scientist) (born 1981), English football coach, mountainbiker and kickboxer
John Phillips (fighter) (born 1985), Welsh mixed martial artist
John Phillips (American football) (born 1987), American football tight end

Others
John Phillips (pirate) (died 1724), English captain of the pirate ship Revenge
John Phillips (surveyor) (died 1897), British engineer and surveyor
John Vassall (a.k.a. John Phillips, 1924–1996), British convicted spy
John Aristotle Phillips (born 1955), American entrepreneur known as the "A-Bomb Kid"

Other uses
John Phillips (John, the Wolf King of L.A.), musical album by John Phillips of The Mamas and the Papas

See also
John Phillip (1817–1867), British painter
Jonathan Phillips (disambiguation)
Jack Phillips (disambiguation)
John Philip (disambiguation)
John Philipps (disambiguation)